William Molloy may refer to:

William Molloy, Baron Molloy (1918–2001), British Labour Party politician
William Molloy (Manitoba politician) (1877–1917), Canadian Liberal Party politician
William Molloy (Irish politician), member of the Irish Senate
William Molloy (footballer) (1904–?), English footballer